Lagena, a term derived from the Greek word meaning flask, refer to:
 Lagena (anatomy), a structure of the inner ear in humans and animals
 Lagena (foraminifera), a genus of protists